The Amur minnow or Lagowski's minnow (Rhynchocypris lagowskii) is an Asian species of small freshwater cyprinid fish. It is found from the Lena and Amur rivers in the north to the Yangtze in China in the south, and in Japan.

References

Rhynchocypris
Freshwater fish of China
Fish of Russia
Fauna of Siberia
Fish described in 1869